The 1983 Winnipeg Blue Bombers finished in 2nd place in the West Division with a 9–7 record. They appeared in the West Final but lost 39–21 to the BC Lions.

Offseason

CFL Draft

Preseason

Regular season

Standings

Schedule

Playoffs

West Semi-Final

West Final

Awards

1983 CFL All-Stars

References

Winnipeg Blue Bombers seasons
1983 Canadian Football League season by team